The 1962 Manitoba general election was held on December 16, 1962 to elect 57 members to the Legislative Assembly of Manitoba, Canada. It resulted in a majority victory for the incumbent Progressive Conservatives under the leadership of Premier Dufferin Roblin, securing a third term for the party.

Roblin's Tories won 36 seats versus 13 for the Liberals led by Gildas Molgat, 7 for the social democratic New Democrats led by Russell Paulley, and 1 seat for the Social Credit Party led by Jacob Froese.

The Communist Party ran two candidates, neither being successful.

Detailed Results

Summary

Northern Manitoba

|-
| style="background:whitesmoke;"|Churchill
||
|Gordon Beard2,170
|
|Francis Jobin1,973
|
|
||
|John Ingebrigtson
|-
| style="background:whitesmoke;"|Flin Flon
||
|Charles Witney2,375
|
|Eli Ross1,175
|
|Fred Ledieu448
||
|Charles Witney
|-
| style="background:whitesmoke;"|Rupertsland
||
|Joseph Jeannotte2,329
|
|Reginald McKay515
|
|Thomas Hamilton461
||
|Joseph Jeannotte
|-
| style="background:whitesmoke;"|The Pas
||
|John Carroll2,484
|
|Adam Deminick1,497
|
|Rachael Schewchuk430
||
|John Carroll
|}

Southern Manitoba

|-
| style="background:whitesmoke;"|Arthur
||
|J. Douglas Watt2,629
|
|Harry Patmore1,861
|
|
|
|
||
|J. Douglas Watt
|-
| style="background:whitesmoke;"|Birtle-Russell
||
|Robert Smellie2,676
|
|Victor Fulton1,701
|
|Arnold Minish704
|
|
||
|Robert Smellie
|-
| style="background:whitesmoke;"|Brandon
||
|Reginald Lissaman4,771
|
|James Creighton3,182
|
|Hans Fries1542
|
|Harold Wright535
||
|Reginald Lissaman
|-
| style="background:whitesmoke;"|Brokenhead
|
|Richard Mulder1,314
|
|Max Dubas971
||
|Ed Schreyer1,910
|
|
||
|Ed Schreyer
|-
| style="background:whitesmoke;"|Carillon
|
|Peter Thiessen1,278
||
|Leonard Barkman2,116
|
|
|
|Edward Dubois811
||
|Edmond Prefontaine
|-
| style="background:whitesmoke;"|Cypress
||
|Thelma Forbes2,746
|
|Welland Stonehouse1,928
|
|
|
|Charles Turner267
||
|Thelma Forbes
|-
| style="background:whitesmoke;"|Dauphin
||
|Stewart McLean3,247
|
|John Seale1,801
|
|
|
|
||
|Stewart McLean
|-
| style="background:whitesmoke;"|Dufferin
||
|William Homer Hamilton2,542
|
|R.G. Douglas1,309
|
|
|
|
||
|William Homer Hamilton
|-
| style="background:whitesmoke;"|Emerson
|
|Michael Sokolyk1,964
||
|John Tanchak2,545
|
|
|
|
||
|John Tanchak
|-
| style="background:whitesmoke;"|Ethelbert Plains
|
|James Crowe1,376
||
|Michael Hryhorczuk1,930
|
|A. Clifford Matthews706
|
|
||
|Michael Hryhorczuk
|-
| style="background:whitesmoke;"|Fisher
||
|Emil Moeller1,410
|
|Arthur Dublin1,076
|
|Peter Wagner1,323
|
|
||
|Peter Wagner
|-
| style="background:whitesmoke;"|Gimli
||
|George Johnson2,316
|
|Don Martin794
|
|Magnus Eliason917
|
|
||
|George Johnson
|-
| style="background:whitesmoke;"|Gladstone
|
|Jack McPhedran2,020
||
|Nelson Shoemaker2,868
|
|Fred Cooks249
|
|
||
|Nelson Shoemaker
|-
| style="background:whitesmoke;"|Hamiota
||
|Barry Strickland2,573
|
|Frank Taylor2,015
|
|M.S. Antonation329
|
|
||
|Barry Strickland
|-
| style="background:whitesmoke;"|Lac du Bonnet
||
|Oscar Bjornson1,740
|
|John Ateah1,264
|
|John Bracken843
|
|
||
|Oscar Bjornson
|-
| style="background:whitesmoke;"|Lakeside
|
|John Frederick Bate1,452
||
|Douglas Campbell2,009
|
|H.C. Alfen207
|
|
||
|Douglas Campbell
|-
| style="background:whitesmoke;"|La Verendrye
|
|Rene Prefontaine1,086
||
|Albert Vielfaure1,394
|
|
|
|Raymond Thuot719
||
|Stan Roberts
|-
| style="background:whitesmoke;"|Minnedosa
||
|Walter Weir2,828
|
|Frank Anderson1,536
|
|John Lee472
|
|C.V. Hutton456
||
|Walter Weir
|-
| style="background:whitesmoke;"|Morris
||
|Harry Shewman1,648
|
|Phil Perron1,126
|
|
|
|Wilbur Tinkler609
||
|Harry Shewman
|-
| style="background:whitesmoke;"|Pembina
||
|Carolyne Morrison2,436
|
|Charles Cousins2,225
|
|
|
|
||
|Carolyne Morrison
|-
| style="background:whitesmoke;"|Portage la Prairie
|
|John Christianson2,124
||
|Gordon Johnston2,414
|
|Francis Mason220
|
|
||
|John Christianson
|-
| style="background:whitesmoke;"|Rhineland
|
|A.J. Thissen1,478
|
|J.H. Pennber791
|
|
||
|Jacob Froese1,511
||
|Jacob Froese
|-
| style="background:whitesmoke;"|Roblin
||
|Keith Alexander2,205
|
|Charles Filowich1,530
|
|Ray Taylor645
|
|
||
|Keith Alexander
|-
| style="background:whitesmoke;"|Rock Lake
||
|Abram Harrison2,444
|
|Harry Parsonage2,015
|
|J.A. Potter257
|
|
||
|Abram Harrison
|-
| style="background:whitesmoke;"|Rockwood-Iberville
||
|George Hutton2,594
|
|C.E. Crawford1,256
|
|Samuel Cranston471
|
|
||
|George Hutton
|-
| style="background:whitesmoke;"|St. George
|
|John Hjalmasson1,210
||
|Elman Guttormson2,451
|
|
|
|
||
|Elman Guttormson
|-
| style="background:whitesmoke;"|Ste. Rose
|
|J.A. Fletcher1,467
||
|Gildas Molgat2,648
|
|Leon Hoefer147
|
|
||
|Gildas Molgat
|-
| style="background:whitesmoke;"|Selkirk
|
|Ben Massey1,527
||
|Thomas P. Hillhouse2,104
|
|Robert Luining579
|
|
||
|Thomas P. Hillhouse
|-
| style="background:whitesmoke;"|Souris-Lansdowne
||
|Malcolm McKellar2,471
|
|D.L. Barclay1,532
|
|
|
|
||
|Malcolm McKellar
|-
| style="background:whitesmoke;"|Springfield
||
|Fred Klym1,993
|
|William Lucko1,562
|
|
|
|Harold Patzer429
||
|Fred Klym
|-
| style="background:whitesmoke;"|Swan River
||
|James Bilton2,350
|
|Elmir Simms1,004
|
|M.G. Hofford718
|
|
||
|Albert H.C. Corbett
|-
| style="background:whitesmoke;"|Turtle Mountain
||
|Peter J. McDonald2,788
|
|Edward Dow1,973
|
|
|
|C.R. Baskerville691
||
|Edward Dow
|-
| style="background:whitesmoke;"|Virden
||
|Donald McGregor2,828
|
|Malcolm McGregor1,323
|
|
|
|J.J. Morton450
||
|John Thompson
|-
|}

Winnipeg

|-
| style="background:whitesmoke;"|Assiniboia
|
|George Johnson2,993
||
|Stephen Patrick3,232
|
|Al Mackling1,978
|
|
||
|George Johnson
|-
| style="background:whitesmoke;"|Burrows
|
|Peter Okrainec747
||
|Mark Smerchanski1,791
|
|John Hawryluk1,502
|
|Andrew Bileski (Comm.)517
||
|John Hawryluk
|-
| style="background:whitesmoke;"|Elmwood
|
|Don Thompson1,737
|
|John Kozoriz1,815
||
|Steve Peters2,024
|
|
||
|Steve Peters
|-
| style="background:whitesmoke;"|Fort Garry
||
|Sterling Lyon4,721
|
|David Bowles2,828
|
|Cliff Brownridge1,168
|
|
||
|Sterling Lyon
|-
| style="background:whitesmoke;"|Fort Rouge
||
|Gurney Evans3,507
|
|Brock McArthur2,128
|
|William Reid990
|
|
||
|Gurney Evans
|-
| style="background:whitesmoke;"|Inkster
|
|Mary Wayrykaw1,497
|
|John Shanski2,081
||
|Morris Gray2,658
|
|
||
|Morris Gray
|-
| style="background:whitesmoke;"|Kildonan
||
|James Mills3,176
|
|Ernie Rudolph2,751
|
|A.J. Reid3,172
|
|John De Fehr (SC)452
||
|A.J. Reid
|-
| style="background:whitesmoke;"|Logan
|
|Uberta Blackburn1,126
|
|Thomas Blaine1,006
||
|Lemuel Harris1,462
|
|
||
|Lemuel Harris
|-
| style="background:whitesmoke;"|Osborne
||
|Obie Baizley3,025
|
|Robert E. Moffat1,871
|
|Jim Buchanan1,523
|
|
||
|Obie Baizley
|-
| style="background:whitesmoke;"|Radisson
|
|Nelson McLean2,712
|
|Nick Slotek3,169
||
|Russell Paulley4,032
|
|
||
|Russell Paulley
|-
| style="background:whitesmoke;"|River Heights
||
|Maitland Steinkopf5,044
|
|Roy Matas3,941
|
|
|
|
||
|W.B. Scarth
|-
| style="background:whitesmoke;"|St. Boniface
|
|Brunelle Leveille1,937
||
|Laurent Desjardins4,175
|
|Ian Wright662
|
|
||
|Laurent Desjardins
|-
| style="background:whitesmoke;"|St. James
||
|Douglas Stanes2,707
|
|Dave Johnston2,202
|
|William Hardy1,239
|
|
||
|Douglas Stanes
|-
| style="background:whitesmoke;"|St. Johns
|
|M. Baryluk1,236
|
|Ed Pollack1,229
||
|Saul Cherniack1,796
|
|Saul Simkin (Comm.)299F.P. Bashchak (Ind.-Lib.-Lab.)111Sam Bordman (Ind.)54
||
|David Orlikow
|-
| style="background:whitesmoke;"|St. Matthews
||
|William Martin2,485
|
|Don Cook1,771
|
|Gordon Fines1,386
|
|
||
|William Martin
|-
| style="background:whitesmoke;"|St. Vital
||
|Fred Groves3,626
|
|Doug Honeyman2,605
|
|Clare Martineau1,023
|
|Fred Brennan (Ind.)795
||
|Fred Groves
|-
| style="background:whitesmoke;"|Seven Oaks
|
|Jack Chapman2,635
|
|Calvin Scarfe1,600
||
|Arthur E. Wright3,095
|
|
||
|Arthur E. Wright
|-
| style="background:whitesmoke;"|Wellington
||
|Richard Seaborn2,422
|
|Gurzon Havey1,391
|
|Lloyd Stinson2,202
|
|
||
|Richard Seaborn
|-
| style="background:whitesmoke;"|Winnipeg Centre
||
|James Cowan2,779
|
|Frank Lamont1,684
|
|Donovan Swailes1,016
|
|
||
|James Cowan
|-
| style="background:whitesmoke;"|Wolseley
||
|Dufferin Roblin3,207
|
|Russ Davis1,559
|
|Ed Stefaniuk798
|
|
||
|Dufferin Roblin
|-
|}

By-elections 1962 to 1966

|- style="background-color:white"
! style="text-align:right;" colspan=3 |Total valid votes 
! style="text-align:right;" |9,441
! style="text-align:right;" colspan=2 |100

See also
 List of Manitoba political parties

References

Further reading
 

1962 elections in Canada
1962
1962 in Manitoba
December 1962 events in Canada